On August 13, 1950, the paddle steamer Mayakovsky (named for Soviet poet Vladimir Mayakovsky) sank at around 12:00 pm local time due to overloading of the vessel with too many people. A total of 147 people died, including 48 children. It was the deadliest peacetime disaster in Soviet Latvian history. At the time, Latvia was a republic within the Soviet Union, under the rule of Joseph Stalin, and news of the disaster was not published in the state-controlled press. On August 19, 2011, almost 20 years after the breakup of the Soviet Union and Latvia regaining its independence, a memorial plaque was dedicated at the Stone Bridge (the Akmens tilts) in memory of the victims.

References

"Piemiņas plāksne kuģa „Majakovskij” katastrofā bojāgājušajiem" (Latvian)

1950 in the Soviet Union
Maritime incidents in 1950
1950 in Latvia
Man-made disasters in Latvia
Maritime incidents in the Soviet Union
20th century in Riga
Steamships of the Soviet Union
Steamships of Latvia